O Rosal is a municipality in the province of Pontevedra in the autonomous community of Galicia, in Spain. It is situated in the comarca of O Baixo Miño. The municipality has 44.1 km2 and had 6531 inhabitants, according to the 2013 census (INE).

References

External links
Website of O Rosal

Rosal, O